Surena Street is a street in the center of Tehran. This street is named after Parthian General, Spahbod Surena.

Location 
It is located in the southern part of Takhti (Mahnaz) square, between Motahhari (Takht-e-Tavus) street and Beheshti (Abbas Abad) street.

Reputation 
It is the car tuning center in Tehran. This street is very famous among the youth in Tehran.

References

Neighbourhoods in Tehran
Streets in Tehran